Horkýže Slíže is a Slovak rock band formed in 1992 in Nitra. Horkýže Slíže's music contains elements of punk, rock, pop and metal. Their lyrics are known for their humorous content and they sometimes produce parodies of other styles of music, such as 'R'n'B Soul' which is a very clear take-off of contemporary R&B styles. Their other hits include "Maštaľ", "Vlak", "A Ja Sprostá" and many others.

So far, Horkýže Slíže has received two platinum albums (Kýže Sliz & Ukáž Tú Tvoju ZOO).

Members

Current members
Peter Hrivňák (Kuko) - bass guitar (1992-2018), vocals (1992–present)
Mário Sabo (Sabotér, Maj Faking Sistr) - guitar, backing vocals (1992–present)
Juraj Štefánik (Štefko, Doktor) - guitar, backing vocals (1995–present)
Marek Viršík (Vandel) - drums, backing vocals (2002–present)
Veronika Smetanová - bass guitar (2018-present)

Former members
Martin Košovan (Košo) - drums, backing vocals (1992–2002)
Martin Žiak - bass guitar
Noro Ivančík - bass guitar

Discography

Studio albums
V Rámci Oného (1997)
Vo Štvorici Po Opici (1998)
Ja Chaču Tebja (2000)
Festival Chorobná 2001 (2001)
Kýže Sliz (2002)
Alibaba A 40 Krátkych Songov (2003)
Ritero Xaperle Bax (2004)
Ukáž Tú Tvoju ZOO (2007)
54 Dole Hlavou (2009)
St. Mary Huana Ganja (2012)
Pustite Karola (2017)
Alibaba A 40 Krátkych Songov 2 (2021)

Compilations
Best Uff (2001)
V Dobrej Viere 2001-2011 (2011)
Platinum Collection (2013)

Live albums
Živák (CD/DVD) (2005)

Box Set
 Festival Chorobná/Kýže Sliz (2006)
 Box Úplne Prvých 4 Nahrávok (2018)

Demo
Prvý Slíž (CS 1994), (CD reissue 2018)

Website

 www.horkyzeslize.sk - official website (sk)

Slovak rock music groups
Slovak punk rock groups
Comedy rock musical groups
Musical groups established in 1992
Nitra